Burnham is a small crater located to the southeast of the crater Albategnius, in a relatively smooth area of the lunar surface. It was named after American astronomer Sherburne W. Burnham. To the southwest is Vogel.

The irregular tooth-like shape of the rim of Burnham protrudes to the southwest, giving the wall a distorted, asymmetric appearance. There are breaks in the rim to the northwest and southwest, the later forming a valley running about 15 km. The interior floor is rough and irregular, and lacks anything resembling a central peak.  The abundance of small hills covering the crater floor from rim to rim makes it unusual.

Views

Satellite craters
By convention these features are identified on lunar maps by placing the letter on the side of the crater midpoint that is closest to Burnham.

References

External links

Burnham at The Moon Wiki
 
 
 
 

Impact craters on the Moon